The Rialto Theatre is a former movie palace located on Park Avenue in Montreal, Quebec, Canada. It is designated as a National Historic Site of Canada.

Built in 1923-1924 and designed by Montreal architect Joseph-Raoul Gariépy, who specialized in theatre and hospital projects, the Rialto was inspired by the Napoleon III style Paris Opera House. The interior was designed by Emmanuel Briffa, designer of over sixty Canadian movie houses, in the Louis XVI style. The Rialto operated as a cinema until the 1990s.

The Rialto Theatre has undergone many changes since 2000. All of the theatre seats were removed and attempts were even made to convert it into a steakhouse. After nearly thirty years of ownership, owner Elias Kalogeras was finally able to sell it in March 2010 to Le Groupe Merveilles Inc. and its owners Ezio Carosielli and Luisa Sassano. Since then, they have acted on their intention to protect the theatre and restore its unique architecture.

References

External links

Photos of Rialto Theatre at Images Montreal

Beaux-Arts architecture in Canada
Former cinemas in Montreal
Heritage buildings of Quebec
Landmarks in Montreal
Le Plateau-Mont-Royal
Movie palaces
National Historic Sites in Quebec
Theatres completed in 1924
Theatres in Montreal
Theatres on the National Historic Sites of Canada register
1924 establishments in Quebec